Nuaso is a town in Ghana. It is in the Eastern Regional Part of Ghana.
It is in the Manya Krobo Municipality.

Populated places in the Eastern Region (Ghana)